Ruggles of Red Gap is a lost 1918 American silent comedy film directed by Lawrence C. Windom and starring Taylor Holmes, a Broadway stage actor. It was produced by veteran film company Essanay Studios. It was based on Harry Leon Wilson's novel Ruggles of Red Gap.

Cast
Taylor Holmes as Marmaduke Ruggles
Frederick Burton as Cousin Egbert Floud
Lawrence D'Orsay as Honorable George Vane-Basingwell
Virginia Valli as Widow Judson
Edna Phillips as "Klondike" Kate Kenner
Lillian Drew as Mrs. Effie Floud
Rose Mayo as Ma Pettingill
Charles Lane as Earl of Brinstead
Rod La Rocque as Belknap Jackson
Frances Conrad as Mrs. Belknap Jackson
James F. Fulton as Jeff Tuttle
Ferdinand Munier as Senator Floud

References

External links

1918 films
American silent feature films
Lost American films
Films based on American novels
Essanay Studios films
American black-and-white films
Silent American comedy films
1918 comedy films
1918 lost films
Lost comedy films
Films directed by Lawrence C. Windom
1910s American films
1910s English-language films
English-language comedy films